Getting Curious with Jonathan Van Ness is the name of a podcast and a television series by Jonathan Van Ness.

Podcast

The podcast started in 2015. Guests have included Brandi Carlile, Molly Shannon, and Gabrielle Union.

TV series

The podcast was adapted into a television series by Netflix.

References

External links
 Getting Curious with Jonathan Van Ness at IMDb

2015 podcast debuts
Audio podcasts
LGBT-related podcasts
2020s American LGBT-related television series